Muziekweb is the website of Muziekwebplein, formerly Centrale Discotheek Rotterdam (Central Music Library of Rotterdam). The website gives access to the library's collection. It has been described as:

References

Further reading
 Muziekweb: van platenbieb tot nationale bewaarplaats at  website .

External links
 

Online music and lyrics databases